Kenyon & Kenyon LLP was a law firm specializing in intellectual property law. It competed with other IP specialty firms, as well as with most general practice firms that have IP practices. The firm had offices in New York, Washington DC, and Silicon Valley. It provided its global clientele with litigation, prosecution, licensing and counseling services. The firm was particularly known for litigating high-stakes patent cases. In 2016, Kenyon dissolved and 55 of its attorneys were hired by Andrews Kurth, which then renamed itself to Andrews Kurth Kenyon LLP to reflect the firm's expanded expertise in intellectual property and technology.

History
In January 1879, the firm was founded in New York City as Browne & Witter through the partnership of Causten Browne and William C. Witter. Soon thereafter, the firm was renamed Browne, Witter and Kenyon after William H. Kenyon joined the partnership. In 1899, Kenyon became one of the first law firms to hire a female attorney. By the 1960s, the firm had become Kenyon, Kenyon, Reilly, Carr and Chapin, which was later simplified to Kenyon & Kenyon, following the trend to simplify law firm names in the 1990s.

In its early history, the firm litigated cases involving patents held by Thomas Edison, Nicola Tesla, and Charles Brush, which would later become known as the famous "Edison Light Bulb" patent cases. At the turn of the 20th century, when the automotive industry was beginning to take shape, the firm was also invited by Ford Motor Co. to defend it in a patent case involving the Selden patent, which threatened to stop production of Ford's new "Model T."

References

External links
Official Website
Cycling Injury Claim
Personal Injury Lawyer

Patent law firms
Biopharmaceutical law firms
Defunct law firms of the United States
Intellectual property law firms
Law firms based in New York City
Law firms disestablished in 2016
Law firms established in 1879
1879 establishments in New York (state)